The BLH AS-416 was a diesel-electric locomotive of the road switcher type rated at , that rode on three-axle trucks, having an A1A-A1A wheel arrangement.

Used in much the same manner as its four-axle counterpart, the AS-16, though the wheel arrangement spread out the axle load for operation on light rail such as are found on branch lines.

It was introduced in 1950 as a replacement of the DRS-6-4-1500 and remained in BLH’s catalog until their cessation of locomotive manufacture in 1956.

Only 25 units were sold to four railroads — all of whom had bought the earlier model.  The vast majority (17 of the 25 units) were purchased by the original Norfolk Southern Railway (1942–82), becoming a signature locomotive for the company.

Original owners

Preservation

Surviving examples include:
 Columbus and Greenville 606, at the Illinois Railway Museum
 Norfolk Southern 1616, at the North Carolina Transportation Museum.

References

 

Diesel-electric locomotives of the United States
A1A-A1A locomotives
AS-416
Railway locomotives introduced in 1950
Standard gauge locomotives of Algeria
Standard gauge locomotives of the United States
Diesel-electric locomotives of Algeria